Menemerus transvaalicus is a jumping spider species in the genus Menemerus that lives in Lesotho and South Africa. It was first described by Wanda Wesołowska in 1999. It is related to Menemerus bifurcus.

References

Spiders described in 1999
Fauna of Lesotho
Salticidae
Spiders of Africa
Spiders of South Africa
Taxa named by Wanda Wesołowska